The air campaign of the Gulf War, also known as the 1991 bombing of Iraq, was an extensive aerial bombing campaign from 17 January 1991 to 23 February 1991 in response to the Iraqi invasion of Kuwait. Spearheaded by the United States, the Coalition of the Gulf War flew over 100,000 sorties, dropping 88,500 tons of bombs, widely destroying military and civilian infrastructure. The air campaign was commanded by United States Air Force (USAF) lieutenant general Chuck Horner, who briefly served as Commander-in-Chief—Forward of U.S. Central Command while general Norman Schwarzkopf was still in the United States. The British air commanders were Air Vice-Marshal Andrew Wilson (to 17 November 1990) and Air Vice-Marshal Bill Wratten (from 17 November). The air campaign had largely finished by 23 February 1991 when the coalition invasion of Kuwait took place.

The initial strikes were carried out by Tomahawk cruise missiles launched from U.S. Navy warships situated in the Persian Gulf, by F-117A Nighthawk stealth bombers with an armament of laser-guided smart bombs, and by F-4G Wild Weasel aircraft as well as F/A-18 Hornet aircraft armed with HARM anti-radar missiles. These first attacks allowed F-14 Tomcat, F-15 Eagle, F-16 Fighting Falcon, and F/A-18 Hornet combat aircraft to gain air superiority over Iraq and then continue to drop television-guided and laser-guided bombs.

Armed with a GAU-8 rotary cannon and infrared-imaging or optically guided Maverick missiles, USAF A-10 Thunderbolts bombed and destroyed Iraqi armored forces, supporting the advance of U.S. ground troops. United States Marine Corps close air support AV-8B Harriers employed their 25mm rotary cannon, Mavericks, cluster munitions, and napalm against the Iraqi dug-in forces to pave the way forward for the U.S. Marines breaching Iraqi president Saddam Hussein's defenses. The U.S. Army AH-64 Apache and AH-1 Cobra attack helicopters fired laser-guided Hellfire missiles and TOW missiles which were guided to tanks by ground observers or by scout helicopters, such as the OH-58D Kiowa. The Coalition air fleet also made use of the E-3A Airborne Warning and Control Systems and of a fleet of B-52 Stratofortress bombers.

Opposing Forces

Coalition Armed Forces 

On the eve of Operation Desert Storm, the Coalition of the Gulf War numbered 2,430 fixed-wing aircraft in the Kuwaiti Theater of Operations (KTO), almost three-fourths of which belonged to the United States Armed Forces.  When the ground assault began on 24 February, that number had increased to over 2,780.  Representing a relatively high tooth-to-tail ratio, approximately 60 percent of Coalition aircraft were "shooters" or combat aircraft.  The United States Air Force deployed over 1,300 aircraft during the course of the campaign, followed by the United States Navy with over 400 aircraft and the United States Marine Corps with approximately 240.  Collectively, the other Coalition partners accounted for over 600 aircraft. Saudi Arabia, Kuwait, Bahrain, Qatar, and the United Arab Emirates all contributed air forces to the campaign, as did the United Kingdom (Operation Granby), France (Opération Daguet), Canada (Operation Friction) and Italy (Operazione Locusta). South Korea, Argentina and New Zealand provided a small number of transport aircraft, with South Korea, Kuwait, Italy and Japan also paying for the cost of 200 airlift flights into Saudi Arabia.  Additionally, Germany, Belgium and Italy each sent a squadron of fighters as part of their NATO obligation to protect Turkey, although these aircraft were strictly defensive and did not take part in the campaign against Iraq.

In terms of quantity and quality, Coalition airpower was superior to its Iraqi counterpart.  This was particularly the case in special capabilities which the Iraqis simply lacked, including aerial refueling, airborne command and control, electronic warfare, precision munitions and stealth aircraft.  Such capabilities were primarily (if not exclusively) provided for by the United States.  In space, sixteen military communications satellites (fourteen of which belonged to the United States) were supplemented with five commercial satellites to provide the vast majority of communication within the theater of operations.  Combined they had a total transmission rate of 200 million bits per second, or equivalent to 39,000 simultaneous telephone calls.  A range of other satellites provided additional intelligence-gathering services, including the Defense Support Program, Landsat program, SPOT, and six meteorological satellites.

One area where the Coalition was deficient was in tactical reconnaissance.  Aircraft specializing in reconnaissance were reportedly given low priority due to lack of space and the belief that strategic platforms could take over their role, a belief which would prove misplaced.  Efforts to compensate for this deficiency included using regular fighter aircraft in the reconnaissance role and RQ-2 Pioneer unmanned aerial vehicles.  Deployed mainly by the US Marines, the RQ-2 was sufficient for certain missions but lacking in many respects compared to dedicated aircraft.

Iraqi Armed Forces 
At the time of the Gulf War the Iraqi Air Force (IQAF) was the sixth largest in the world, consisting of over 750 fixed-wing combat aircraft operating out of 24 primary airfields, with 13 active dispersal fields and 19 additional dispersal fields. Iraq had also constructed 594 hardened aircraft shelters to house nearly its entire air force, protecting them from attack.  Iraq similarly possessed an impressive amount of air defenses.  Its inventory included 16,000 surface-to-air missiles total, both radar and infrared guided, with over 3,600 of these major missile systems.  Up to 154 SAM sites and 18 SAM support facilities were located in Iraq, with another 20 or 21 sites in the Kuwati theater of operations (KTO).  Iraq also possessed a large number of anti-aircraft artillery (AAA), with 972 AAA sites, 2,404 fixed AA guns and 6,100 mobile AA guns.  Providing complete coverage of Iraqi airspace were 478 early warning radars, 75 high-frequency radars, and 154 acquisition radars.

Much of this equipment was combined into an integrated air defense system (IADS) overseen by Kari, an automated C2 computer system developed by Iraq and built by French contractors in the wake of Operation Opera (Kari in turn is the French spelling of Iraq backwards).  Kari tied the entire IADS to a single location, the national Air Defense Operations Center (ADOC) located in an underground bunker in Baghdad, and in turn divided the country into four defense sectors each overseen by a Sector Operations Center (SOC) located at H-3, Kirkuk, Taji and Talil; a fifth SOC was added at Ali Al Salem to cover the recently conquered Kuwait.  Each SOC oversaw the local airspace and commanded anywhere from two to five Intercept Operations Centers (IOCs) per sector.  The IOCs were located in bunkers constructed at Iraqi Air Force bases and tied into local radar systems, whose information they could pass on to their SOC and thence on to Baghdad.  In this way a SOC was capable of simultaneously tracking 120 aircraft and selecting for the appropriate weapon system to engage them.  The SOC could automatically target for SA-2 and SA-3 SAM systems in their sector, which meant the SAMs did not have to turn on their own radar and reveal their position, or an IOC could direct local interceptors to engage the targets. Baghdad itself was one of the most heavily defended cities in the world—more heavily defended several times over than Hanoi during the Vietnam War—protected by 65% of Iraq's SAMs and over half of its AAA pieces.

Though impressive on paper, the Iraqi Air Force's primary role was to act as a regional deterrent, with a secondary role of supporting the Iraqi Army, rather than attempt to gain air superiority in any conflict.  Basic training was rigid, inflexible, and left pilots with extremely poor situational awareness.  Additional training was provided by the Soviet Union, with Mirage pilots attending courses in France.  Soviet trainers generally passed everyone but assessed less than half of the IQAF students would have been accepted into Soviet fighter units.  French training (which the Iraqis considered decidedly superior to Soviet) resulted in an 80% failure rate; nevertheless those who failed were qualified to fly upon return to Iraq.  In all, a third of Iraqi pilots were deemed to meet the standards of Western pilots, and almost all of them lacked aggressiveness and were overly dependent on ground control to direct them to targets.  In addition, the air force suffered from spare parts shortages and maintenance shortfalls, and a majority of their equipment like the MiG-21 were outdated and of dubious combat value.  Only 170 aircraft like the MiG-29 and Mirage F1 were considered comparable to Coalition aircraft, with the MiG-29 being downgraded export models.

Likewise, Kari itself had a number of deficiencies of which Coalition air forces would take advantage. The system was primarily oriented towards defending against much smaller attacks from Iraq's most likely enemies—Iran, Syria and Israel—and focused on point defense rather than area defense. This meant there were significant gaps in its coverage, particularly on the orientation from Saudi Arabia straight to Baghdad, and attacking aircraft would be able to approach their target from multiple directions. Like its aircraft, much of Iraq's ground air defenses were also outdated: SA-2 and SA-3 systems were nearing the end of their operational lifespan and their countermeasures were well-known at this point, while its other SAM systems were not much younger. Furthermore, the IADS was centralized to a fault. Although each IOC was datalinked to their respective SOC and in turn back to the ADOC, the defense sectors couldn't share information between each other. If a SOC was knocked out of action the attached air defense weapons lost all ability to coordinate their response; its respective SAM batteries would be forced to rely on their own radar systems while most AAA lacked any radar guidance.

Main air campaign starts 

A day after the deadline set in United Nations Security Council Resolution 678, the coalition launched a massive air campaign, which began the general offensive codenamed Operation Desert Storm with more than 1,000 sorties launching per day. It began on 17 January 1991, at 2:38 AM, Baghdad time, when Task Force Normandy (eight US Army AH-64 Apache helicopters led by four US Air Force MH-53 Pave Low helicopters) destroyed Iraqi radar sites near the Iraqi–Saudi Arabian border which could have warned Iraq of an upcoming attack.

At 2:43 A.M. two USAF EF-111 Ravens with terrain following radar led 22 USAF F-15E Strike Eagles against assaults on airfields in Western Iraq. Minutes later, one of the EF-111 crews—Captain James Denton and Captain Brent Brandon—destroyed an Iraqi Dassault Mirage F1, when their low altitude maneuvering led the F1 to crash to the ground.

At 3:00 AM, ten USAF F-117 Nighthawk stealth bombers, under the protection of a three-ship formation of EF-111s, bombed Baghdad, the capital. The striking force came under fire from 3,000 anti-aircraft guns on the ground.

Within hours of the start of the coalition air campaign, a P-3 Orion called Outlaw Hunter developed by the US Navy's Space and Naval Warfare Systems Command, which was testing a highly specialised over-the-horizon radar, detected a large number of Iraqi patrol boats and naval vessels attempting to make a run from Basra and Umm Qasr to Iranian waters. Outlaw Hunter vectored in strike elements, which attacked the Iraqi naval flotilla near Bubiyan Island, destroying eleven vessels and damaging scores more.

Concurrently, US Navy BGM-109 Tomahawk cruise missiles struck targets in Baghdad, and other coalition aircraft struck targets throughout Iraq. Government buildings, TV stations, airfields, presidential palaces, military installations, communication lines, supply bases, oil refineries, a Baghdad airport, electric powerplants and factories making Iraqi military equipment were all destroyed by massive aerial and missile attacks from coalition forces.

Five hours after the first attacks, Iraq's state radio broadcast a voice identified as Saddam Hussein declaring that "The great duel, the mother of all battles has begun. The dawn of victory nears as this great showdown begins."

The Gulf War is sometimes called the "computer war", due to the advanced computer-guided weapons and munitions used in the air campaign, which included precision-guided munitions and cruise missiles, even though these were very much in the minority when compared with "dumb bombs" used. Cluster munitions and BLU-82 "Daisy Cutters" were also used.

Iraq responded by launching eight Iraqi modified Scud missiles into Israel the next day. These missile attacks on Israel were to continue throughout the six weeks of the war.

On the first night of the war, two F/A-18s from the carrier USS Saratoga were flying outside of Baghdad when two Iraqi MiG-25s engaged them. In the beyond-visual-range (BVR) kill, an Iraqi MiG-25 piloted by Zuhair Dawood fired an R-40RD missile, shooting down an American F/A-18C Hornet and killing its pilot, Lieutenant Commander Scott Speicher.

In an effort to demonstrate their own air offensive capability, on 24 January the Iraqis attempted to mount a strike against the major Saudi oil refinery, Ras Tanura. Two Mirage F1 fighters laden with incendiary bombs and two MiG-23s (acting as fighter cover) took off from bases in Iraq. They were spotted by US AWACs, and two Royal Saudi Air Force F-15s were sent to intercept. When the Saudis appeared the Iraqi MiGs turned tail, but the Mirages pressed on. Captain Iyad Al-Shamrani, one of the Saudi pilots, maneuvered his jet behind the Mirages and shot down both aircraft. A few days later the Iraqis made their last true air offensive of the war, unsuccessfully attempting to shoot down F-15s patrolling the Iranian border. After this episode, the Iraqis made no more air efforts of their own, sending most of their jets to Iran in hopes that they might someday get their air force back.

The first priority for Coalition forces was the destruction of Iraqi command and control bunkers, Scud missile launch pads and storage areas, telecommunications and radio facilities, and airfields. The attack began with a wave of deep-penetrating aircraft – F-111s, F-15Es, Tornado GR1s, F-16s, A-6s, A-7Es, and F-117s, complemented by F-15C, F-14s and Air Defense Tornados. EA-6Bs, EF-111 radar jammers, and F-117A stealth planes were heavily used in this phase to elude Iraq's extensive SAM systems and anti-aircraft weapons. The sorties were launched mostly from Saudi Arabia and the six Coalition aircraft carrier battle groups (CVBG) in the Persian Gulf and Red Sea. During the initial 24 hours 2,775 sorties were flown, including seven B-52s which flew a 35-hour nonstop 14,000-mile round-trip from Barksdale Air Force Base and launched 35 AGM-86 CALCM cruise missiles against eight Iraqi targets.

Persian Gulf CVBGs included USS Midway, USS Theodore Roosevelt, and USS Ranger. USS America, USS John F. Kennedy, and USS Saratoga operated from the Red Sea (USS America transitioned to the Persian Gulf midway through the air war).

Wild Weasels were very effective; unlike North Vietnamese, Iraqi SAM operators did not turn radar off until just before launch. Antiaircraft defenses, including shoulder-launched ground-to-air missiles, were surprisingly ineffective against coalition aircraft and the coalition suffered only 75 aircraft losses in over 100,000 sorties, though only 42 of these were the result of Iraqi action. The other 33 were lost to accidents. In particular, RAF and US Navy aircraft which flew at low altitudes to avoid radar were particularly vulnerable, though this changed when the aircrews were ordered to fly above the AAA.

The next coalition targets were command and communication facilities. Saddam Hussein had closely micromanaged the Iraqi forces in the Iran–Iraq War, and initiative at lower levels was discouraged. Coalition planners hoped that Iraqi resistance would quickly collapse if deprived of command and control.

Iraq's air force units flight to Iran 

The first week of the air war saw a few Iraqi sorties, but these did little damage, and 36 Iraqi fighter aircraft were shot down by Coalition planes. Soon after, the Iraqi Air Force began fleeing to Iran, with 115 to 140 aircraft flown there. This mass exodus of Iraqi aircraft took coalition forces by surprise as the Coalition had been expecting them to flee to Jordan, a nation friendly to Iraq, rather than Iran, a long-time enemy. As the purpose of the war was to destroy Iraq militarily, the coalition had placed aircraft over western Iraq to try to stop any retreat into Jordan. This meant they were unable to react before most of the Iraqi aircraft had made it "safely" to Iranian airbases. The coalition eventually established a virtual "wall" of F-15 Eagles, F-14 Tomcats, and F-16 Fighting Falcons on the Iraq–Iran border (called MIGCAP), thereby stopping the exodus of fleeing Iraqi fighters. In response, the Iraqi Air Force launched Operation Samurra in an attempt to break the blockade imposed on them. The resulting air battle would be the last offensive action of the war for the Iraqi Air Force. 

It was unclear if there had been a formal agreement between Iraq and Iran, with some suggesting that the deal had been hastily drawn up, and initially only permitted sancturary for Iraqi civilian and transport aircraft. Iran did not allow the Iraqi aircrews to be released until years later. Iran held on to the Iraqi aircraft for over 20 years, whose value was collectively estimated at $2.5 billion, as partial payment of the $900 billion in reparations but eventually returned 88 of them in 2014. However, many Iraqi planes remained in Iran, and several were destroyed by coalition forces.

Infrastructure bombing 

The third and largest phase of the air campaign ostensibly targeted military targets throughout Iraq and Kuwait: Scud missile launchers, weapons research facilities, and naval forces. About one-third of the Coalition airpower was devoted to attacking Scuds, some of which were on trucks and therefore difficult to locate. Some U.S. and British special forces teams had been covertly inserted into western Iraq to aid in the search and destruction of Scuds. However, the lack of adequate terrain for concealment hindered their operations, and some of them were killed or captured such as occurred with the widely publicised Bravo Two Zero patrol of the SAS.

Civilian infrastructure 

Coalition bombing raids destroyed Iraqi civilian infrastructure. 11 of Iraq's 20 major power stations and 119 substations were totally destroyed, while a further six major power stations were damaged. 

Iraqi targets were located by aerial photography and GPS coordinates. According to the non-fiction book, Armored Cav by Tom Clancy, in August 1990, a USAF senior officer arrived at Baghdad International Airport carrying a briefcase with a GPS receiver inside. After being taken to the U.S. embassy he took a single GPS reading in the courtyard of the complex. Upon return to the U.S. the coordinates were used as the basis for designating targets in Baghdad.

Civilian casualties 

The U.S. government claimed Iraqi officials fabricated numerous attacks on Iraqi holy sites in order to rally the Muslim world to support Iraq during the conflict, pointing to Iraq's claim that Coalition forces had attacked the holy cities of Najaf and Karbala. At the end of the war, the estimated number of Iraqi civilians killed was 2,278 killed and 5,965 wounded. 

On 13 February 1991, a United States Air Force (USAF) warplane fired two laser-guided missiles at an air raid shelter in the Al-A'amiriya neighborhood of Baghdad, killing at least 408 civilians sheltering there. U.S. officials subsequently claimed that the shelter also served as a communications center for the Iraqi military. BBC correspondent Jeremy Bowen, who was one of the first television reporters on the scene, was given access to the shelter and claimed that he did not find any evidence of it being used by the Iraqi military. His claims were later contradicted by Iraqi general Wafiq al-Samarrai, who claimed that the shelter was used by the Iraqi Intelligence Service, and that Saddam Hussein had personally made visits to it. The day after the bombing of the shelter, a Royal Air Force (RAF) fighter jet fired two laser-guided missiles which were aimed at a bridge in Fallujah which was used as part of an Iraqi military supply line. The missiles malfunctioned and struck Fallujah's largest marketplace (which was situated in a residential area), killing between 50 and 150 non-combatants and wounding many more. After news of the mistake became public, an RAF spokesman, Group Captain David Henderson issued a statement noting that the missile had malfunctioned but admitted that the Royal Air Force had made an error.

Vulnerability of Iraq to air attacks 

The air campaign devastated entire Iraqi brigades deployed in the open desert in combat formation. It also prevented an effective Iraqi resupply of units engaged in combat, and prevented some 450,000 Iraqi troops from achieving a larger force concentration.

The air campaign had a significant effect on the tactics employed by opposing forces in subsequent conflicts. Entire Iraqi divisions were dug in the open while facing U.S. forces. They were not dispersed, as with the Yugoslav forces in Kosovo. Iraqi forces also tried to reduce the length of their supply lines and the total area defended.

Losses 

An estimated 407 Iraqi aircraft were either destroyed or flown to Iran and permanently impounded there. During Desert Storm, 36 aircraft were shot down in aerial combat. Three helicopters and 2 fighters were shot down during the invasion of Kuwait on 2 August 1990. Kuwait claims to have shot down as many as 37 Iraqi aircraft. These claims have not been confirmed. In addition, 68 fixed wing aircraft and 13 helicopters were destroyed while on the ground, and 137 aircraft were flown to Iran and never returned.

The Coalition lost a total of 75 aircraft—52 fixed-wing aircraft and 23 helicopters–during Desert Storm, with 39 fixed-wing aircraft and 5 helicopters lost in combat. One coalition fighter was lost in air-air combat, a U.S. Navy F/A-18 piloted by Scott Speicher. Other Iraqi air to air claims surfaced over the years, all were disputed. One B-52G was lost while returning to its operating base on Diego Garcia, when it suffered a catastrophic electrical failure and crashed into the Indian Ocean killing 3 of the 6 crew members on board. The rest of the Coalition losses came from anti-aircraft fire. The Americans lost 28 fixed-wing aircraft and 15 helicopters; the British lost 7 fixed-wing aircraft; the Saudi Arabians lost 2; the Italians lost 1; and the Kuwaitis lost 1. During the invasion of Kuwait on 2 August 1990, the Kuwaiti Air Force lost 12 fixed-wing aircraft, which were destroyed on the ground, and 8 helicopters, 6 of which were shot down and 2 of which were destroyed while on the ground.

See also 
 Air engagements of the Gulf War
 Gulf War Air Power Survey
 List of Gulf War pilots by victories

References

Bibliography

External links 
 Bibliography of the Desert Shield and Desert Storm  compiled by the United States Army Center of Military History

 
Airstrikes in Iraq